The 1979–80 Rotary Watches National Basketball League season was the eighth season of the National Basketball League.

The league was sponsored by Rotary Watches for the second consecutive year and Crystal Palace won an unprecedented treble of League, Playoffs and National Cup. Crystal Palace were helped by Alton Byrd, who would become the best known name in British basketball and pick up the season MVP award.

Team changes
Malcolm Chamberlain, the owner of the London Metros uprooted the team, relocating from London to Kingston upon Thames and the Tolworth Recreation Centre, rebranding as Kingston. With their added sponsorship they would be known as Kelly Girls International Kingston. Guildford Pirates, the NBL Division 2 champions, joined the league and following a sponsorship deal would be Team Talbot, Guildford.  Runners-up Hemel Hempstead also joined the league and would be known as Hemel Hempstead Ovaltine playing at Bletchley Leisure Centre. The Blackpool Pacemakers completed the newcomers to the league. The Milton Keynes All-Stars, Loughborough All-Stars, Exeter St Lukes TSB and Bracknell Bullets all dropped out.

National League standings

Division One

Division Two

Rotary Watches playoffs

Semi-finals

Third Place

Final

Butlins National Cup Final

References

See also
Basketball in England
British Basketball League
English Basketball League
List of English National Basketball League seasons

National Basketball League (England) seasons
 
British